Braddell Secondary School was a co-educational government secondary school in Singapore.
It started operations in 1981 and ceased to exist in 2000, when it was merged with Westlake Secondary School to form Braddell-Westlake Secondary School

History
The school was started in 1981 as a co-educational and English-medium school and it was officially opened by then-MP for Boon Teck Michael Liew Kok Pun on 28 April 1983. It was housed in a S$6.65 million campus made out of two sunken courtyards and five blocks.

Merger with Westlake Secondary School
The last graduating batch as Braddellites (which the students were commonly known as) was in 1999, after which they merged with Westlake Secondary School to form Braddell-Westlake Secondary School. Braddell Secondary School's campus became Campus 1, housing upper secondary students. Braddell-Westlake Secondary School's students and teachers were transferred to Guangyang Secondary School after closing down in 2005.

References

 http://www3.moe.edu.sg/prime/dgp/toa_payoh/secondary_sch/braddell_sec/braddell_sec.htm

Toa Payoh
Secondary schools in Singapore
Educational institutions established in 1981
1981 establishments in Singapore